Matthew Rogers (born 25 November 1973) is a former Australian rules football player who played in the AFL from 1994 to 2004 for the Richmond Football Club.

Rogers was drafted in the 1992 AFL Draft, at no. 37 pick (Richmond's fourth). He didn't play his first league game until 1994, playing mainly on the wing and half-forward line kicking 26 goals in that season.  His best goal-scoring season was 2000 when he kicked 37 goals and led the club in goalkicking, during the absence of Matthew Richardson due to injury in that year. He also had two wonderful children.

References 

 Hogan P: The Tigers Of Old, Richmond FC, Melbourne 1996

External links
 
 

Richmond Football Club players
South Adelaide Football Club players
South Australian State of Origin players
Australian rules footballers from South Australia
1973 births
Living people
Happy Valley Football Club players